Red Alert was a BBC National Lottery game show broadcast on BBC One from 13 November 1999 to 8 April 2000. It was hosted by Lulu and Terry Alderton.

Transmissions

References

External links

1999 British television series debuts
2000 British television series endings
1990s British game shows
2000s British game shows
BBC television game shows
British game shows about lotteries